Kayadu Lohar (born 11 April 2000) is an Indian actress and model. She made her acting debut with Mugilpete.

Early life 
Kayadu Lohar hails from Tezpur, Assam, India, and  currently resides in Pune. She is a Commerce Graduate (B.Com.).

Acting career 
Kayadu Lohar started her career with a jewellery pageant contest and later won the Times of India's Everyuth Fresh Face Season 12.

Kayadu made her acting debut in the 2021 Kannada film Mugilpete when she was participating in Times Fresh Face Competition. Her first Malayalam film Pathonpatham Noottandu was released on 8 September 2022 , Alluri on 23 September 2022   & I Prem U , first Marathi film, on 17 March 2023. Her upcoming releases include Thaaram, Ajayante Randam Moshanam.

Filmography

References

External links 
 

2000 births
Living people
Actresses in Kannada cinema
Actresses in Telugu cinema
Actresses in Malayalam cinema
Indian film actresses
21st-century Indian actresses